The SP-21 Barak (lightning) is a double action/single action semi-automatic, recoil-operated pistol developed and produced by Israel Weapon Industries in 2002. The gun was made to suit both self-defense and law enforcement needs.

The SP-21 Barak is made of polymer and its grip has integrated polymer. It has a frame-mounted thumb safety. The Israeli-made weapon was marketed to Europe and United States in 2003. The gun's suggested retail price is US$499.

References 

Semi-automatic pistols of Israel
9mm Parabellum semi-automatic pistols
.40 S&W semi-automatic pistols
.45 ACP semi-automatic pistols